De Greef is a Dutch occupational surname. Greef is an archaic and/or regional spelling of Dutch graaf, meaning either the head of a municipal council (schepen) or a count. It may refer to:

De Greef
Arnaud De Greef (born 1992), Belgian footballer
Arthur De Greef (composer) (1862–1940), Belgian pianist and composer
Arthur De Greef (tennis) (born 1992), Belgian tennis player
 (1818–1899), Dutch architect; city architect of Amsterdam from 1834 to 1890
Elvire De Greef (1897-1991), Belgian woman who helped downed allied airmen during World War II escape Nazi capture. 
Eugène De Greef (1900–1995), Belgian politician and minister of defence
Francis De Greef (born 1985), Belgian road cyclist
 (1784–1834), Dutch architect; city architect of Amsterdam from 1820 to 1834
Janine De Greef (1925-2020), Belgian teenager who helped downed allied airmen during World War II. 
Lien De Greef (born 1981), Belgian singer
Peter De Greef (1922-1980), British actor
Robbert de Greef (1991-2019), Dutch cyclist
Walter De Greef (born 1957), Belgian footballer
De Greeff
Thijs de Greeff (born 1982), Dutch field hockey player

See also
De Graaf
De Graeff, old Dutch patrician family

Dutch-language surnames
Occupational surnames

de:Greef
fr:Greef